Na Litavce is a football stadium in Příbram, Czech Republic. It is currently used as the home ground of FK Viagem Příbram. The stadium holds 9,100 people.

History
The stadium was opened September 11, 1955, starting the series of promotions of the home club Baník Příbram from the regional competition up to the third highest nationwide league within 13 years and to the second division in 1974 (only for five seasons). The name of the stadium is derived from the name of the Litavka river, located just behind the west stand. It flows north to Beroun where it joins the Berounka river.

The major reconstruction of stadium was made between 1978 and 1980. The construction was funded by the Uranium Mines company, many of the miners and company workers joined the work voluntarily. New stands and entry gate were built as well as two buildings with flats and hotel rooms, which remain the mark of the stadium. The western stand was roofed and the capacity of the stadium was around 11,000 spectators.

In 1996 FC Portál Příbram merged with Dukla Prague and the new team played in Prague for a year before moving to Příbram in 1997. The eastern stand was roofed and the third stand was built. The stadium had to be modernized to correspond with the Football Association of the Czech Republic's new standards, all stands are for seated spectators, which lowered the capacity to 9,100, and the floodlight towers were erected. Due to flooding of the nearby Litavka river, the stadium was submerged during the 2002 European floods. This caused a game with Slavia Prague to be postponed.

References

External links
 Photo gallery and data at Erlebnis-stadion.de
 Stadium page on FK Marila Příbram's web (in Czech)
 Year 2005 page of city of Příbram chronicle with a note on stadium's foundation 50th anniversary.

Football venues in the Czech Republic
Czech First League venues
1. FK Příbram
Buildings and structures in the Central Bohemian Region
Sports venues completed in 1955
1955 establishments in Czechoslovakia
20th-century architecture in the Czech Republic